HD 120213 (HR 5188) is a solitary star in the southern circumpolar constellation Chamaeleon. It is faintly visible to the naked eye with an apparent magnitude of 5.94 and is estimated to be 910 light years away from the Solar System.

HD 120213 has a stellar classification of K2 III: CN−1 CH −2.5, indicating that its a red giant with an under abundance of CH molecules and cyano radicals in its spectrum. It has also been classified as a mild barium star, but there is uncertainty about the spectral class. HD 120213 has a metallicity 56% that of the Sun and spins with a projected rotational velocity too low to be accurately measured.

References

Chamaeleon (constellation)
K-type giants
Barium stars
120213
068009
5188
Chamaeleontis, 50
PD-82 585